The Westland N.1B was a prototype British single-engined floatplane fighter aircraft of the First World War. The first aircraft to be designed by Westland Aircraft, it was a single-engined tractor biplane. Despite good performance, only two aircraft were built, the Royal Naval Air Service operating landplane fighters from ships instead.

Development and design
In 1916, the British Admiralty drew up Requirement N.1B for a single-seat floatplane or flying boat fighter aircraft to operate from the Royal Navy's seaplane carriers, demanding a speed of 110 mph (177 km/h) and a ceiling of 20,000 ft (6,100 m). Three companies submitted designs in response, Blackburn and Supermarine with flying boats (the Blackburn N.1B and Supermarine Baby), while Westland proposed a floatplane, the Westland N.1B. Westland received an order for two aircraft.

Westland's design, which was the first original design built by Westland, was a single-engined tractor biplane of wooden construction. It had a deep fuselage, while its two-bay wings were designed to fold to save space on ship, and were fitted with trailing-edge flaps. It was powered by a single Bentley A.R.1 rotary engine (later known as the BR1) and carried a single synchronised forward-firing Vickers machine gun  on the nose, and a Lewis gun firing over the upper wing.  The first N.1B was fitted with 11 ft (3.35 m) long Sopwith main floats and a 5 ft (1.52 m) long tail float, while the second N.1B had much longer (17 ft 6 in 5.34 m) main floats, which removed the need for a tail float.

The first N.1B, serial number N16 was first flown by Harry Hawker from Westland's Yeovil factory in August 1917. The two N.1Bs were evaluated at the Port Victoria Marine Experimental Aircraft Depot in October 1917, demonstrating good performance and handling.  By this time, however, the Royal Naval Air Service was operating Sopwith Pup landplanes from flying-off platforms aboard ships, which did not require the carrier to heave-to in order to lower a seaplane to the water, and was planning to carry out similar operations with the Sopwith Camel, and the N.1B programme was cancelled.

Specifications (Second prototype)

See also

References

Bruce, J.M. British Aeroplanes 1914–18. London:Putnam, 1957.
James, Derek N. Westland Aircraft since 1915. London:Putnam, 1991. .
Mason, Francis K. The British Fighter since 1912. Annapolis, USA:Naval Institute Press, 1992. .

External links
Westland History – Westland N.1B (1917) Agustawestland.

Floatplanes
1910s British fighter aircraft
N.1B
Biplanes
Single-engined tractor aircraft
Rotary-engined aircraft
Aircraft first flown in 1917